Halprin is a surname. Notable people with the surname include:

 Alexander Halprin (1868–1921), Russian-Austrian chess master
 Anna Halprin (1920–2021), American dancer
 Daria Halprin (born 1948), psychologist
 Lawrence Halprin (1916–2009), American landscape architect
 Randy Halprin (born 1963), American convict
 Rob Halprin (born 1958), American record producer
 Rose Halprin (1896–1978), American Zionist leader

See also
 Halprin Open Space Sequence

Jewish surnames